Kenwood Evangelical Church (also known as Kenwood United Church of Christ) is a historic church building at 4600-4608 South Greenwood Avenue in Chicago, Illinois.

The Romanesque building was constructed in 1887 and added to the National Register of Historic Places in 1991.

The church is also a designated Chicago Landmark, as of October 5, 2011.

References

Churches in Chicago
Evangelical churches in Illinois
Chicago Landmarks
Properties of religious function on the National Register of Historic Places in Chicago
Churches completed in 1887
Romanesque Revival church buildings in Illinois
United Church of Christ churches in Illinois
1887 establishments in Illinois
Churches on the National Register of Historic Places in Illinois